Dietrich Felix von Bothmer (pronounced BOAT-mare; October 26, 1918 – October 12, 2009) was a German-born American art historian, who spent six decades as a curator at the Metropolitan Museum of Art, where he developed into the world's leading specialist in the field of ancient Greek vases.

Early life and education
Bothmer was born in Eisenach, Germany on October 26, 1918. An ardent opponent of the Nazi dictatorship, he attended Berlin's Friedrich Wilhelms University and then went to Wadham College, Oxford in 1938 on the final Rhodes Scholarship awarded in Germany. There he worked with Sir John Beazley on his books Attic Red-Figure Vase-Painters and Attic Black-Figure Vase-Painters, working collaboratively to group works by identifying the individual craftsmen and workshops that had created each of hundreds of Greek vases. He graduated in 1939 with a major in classical archaeology.

A tour of museums in the United States in 1939 left Bothmer stuck there with the start of World War II. Due to his strong anti-Nazi sentiments, he refused to return to Germany, and narrowly escaped being sent back to Germany against his will. He earned his doctorate at the University of California, Berkeley in 1944. Though not yet a citizen, in 1943 he volunteered for the United States Army. After 90 days in the U.S. Army, he was sworn in as a U.S. citizen in March, 1944. He served in the Pacific theater of operations, earning a Bronze Star Medal and Purple Heart for a conspicuous act of bravery on August 11, 1944, while serving in the South Pacific, where, despite being wounded himself in the thigh, foot, and arm, he recovered a wounded comrade and carried him back three miles through enemy lines.

Career

Following the completion of his military service, Bothmer was hired by the Metropolitan Museum of Art in 1946, and was named as a curator in 1959. By 1973, he was department chairman and he was named in 1990 as distinguished research curator.

In 1972, together with the Director, Thomas Hoving, Bothmer argued in favor of the purchase of the Euphronios Krater, a vase used to mix wine with water that dated from the sixth century BCE. They convinced the museum's board to purchase the artifact for $1 million, which the museum funded through the sale of its coin collection. The Government of Italy demanded the object's return, citing claims that the vase had been taken illegally from an ancient Etruscan site near Rome. The krater was one of 20 pieces that the museum sent back to Italy in 2008 in exchange for multi-year loans of ancient artifacts that were put on display at the Met, as part of an agreement reached in 2006.

Bothmer's 1977 exhibit "Thracian Treasures from Bulgaria" covered twenty centuries of Thracian culture, with more than 500 art works dating back to the Copper Age. The 1979 show "Greek Art of the Aegean Islands" included 191 pieces, of which 46 came from the Met and a similar number from the Louvre. The remainder came from several different museums in Greece, including the largest known Cycladic sculpture, dating to 2700 to 2300 BCE, on loan from the National Archaeological Museum, Athens. A 1985 exhibition based on his research, "The Amasis Painter and his World: Vase Painting in Sixth Century B.C. Athens," included 65 works of a single artist who created his pottery 2,500 years before, the first to document the history of the work of a single craftsman from that ancient period as a one-man show.

Bothmer's numerous published works in the field include the 1957 Amazons in Greek Art, Ancient Art From New York Private Collections and An Inquiry Into the Forgery of the Etruscan Terracotta Warriors in the Metropolitan Museum of Art (with Joseph V. Noble), both published in 1961, Greek Vase Painting: an Introduction in 1972, his 1985 book The Amasis Painter and His World: Vase-Painting in Sixth-Century B.C. Athens, his 1991 book Glories of the Past: Ancient Art from the Shelby White and Leon Levy Collection, and in 1992, Euphronios, peintre: Actes de la journee d'etude organisee par l'Ecole du Louvre et le Departement des antiquites grecques, etrusques de l'Ecole du Louvre (French Edition). He also contributed in 1983 to Wealth of the Ancient World (Hunt Art Collections), Development of the Attic Black-Figure, Revised Edition (Sather Classical Lectures) in 1986, and a wide variety of other publications.

Bothmer took a faculty position in 1965 at the Institute of Fine Arts, the nation's top-ranked graduate program in art history, according to the National Research Council's 1994 study.

He was the recipient of numerous awards and citations, including a Chevalier de la Légion d'honneur. He was  a member of the Académie française (one of only two Americans to have this honor), an honorary fellow of Wadham College, and the recipient of several honorary doctorates.

Complementing his career as a curator and an academic, he served on the Art Advisory Council of the International Foundation for Art Research.

Death
A resident of both the Manhattan borough of New York City and Oyster Bay, New York, Dietrich von Bothmer died at age 90 on October 19, 2009, in Manhattan. He was survived by his wife, Joyce de La Bégassière (née Blaffer), as well as by a son, Bernard von Bothmer of San Francisco, a daughter, Maria Villalba of New York City, three stepdaughters, five grandchildren, and five step-grandchildren. His brother was the renowned Egyptologist Bernard v. Bothmer, who died in 1993.

References

External links
Greek vase painting, a catalog from The Metropolitan Museum of Art Libraries (fully available online as PDF) by Dietrich von Bothmer

1918 births
2009 deaths
People from Eisenach
Alumni of Wadham College, Oxford
United States Army personnel of World War II
German art historians
German Rhodes Scholars
Humboldt University of Berlin alumni
Members of the Académie Française
People associated with the Metropolitan Museum of Art
New York University faculty
People from Manhattan
People from Oyster Bay (town), New York
United States Army soldiers
German male non-fiction writers
German emigrants to the United States